The 11th constituency of Val-de-Marne is a French legislative constituency in the Val-de-Marne département.

Description

The 11th constituency of Val-de-Marne lies in the north east of the department and is largely made up of the suburb of Villejuif.

Similarly to the neighbouring Val-de-Marne's 10th constituency the seat was held for many years by the French Communist Party, however it was captured by the Socialist Party (France) at the 2002 election. Also like Val-de-Marne's 10th constituency two left wing candidates qualified for the second round and so the second place Left Party candidate withdrew leaving Jean-Yves Le Bouillonnec without an opponent.

On September 9, 2019, Albane Gaillot left the LREM party, then in March 2020, she left the LREM group and became non-registered (deputies who are neither members nor related to a parliamentary group of the National Assembly), then in May 2020, she was one of the 17 initial members of the Ecology Democracy Solidarity group.

Deputies

Election results

2022

 
 
 
 
 
 
 
 
|-
| colspan="8" bgcolor="#E9E9E9"|
|-

2017

 
 
 
 
 
 
 
|-
| colspan="8" bgcolor="#E9E9E9"|
|-

2012

 
 
 
 
 
 
|-
| colspan="8" bgcolor="#E9E9E9"|
|-
 
 

 
 
 
 

* Withdrew before the 2nd round

2007

 
 
 
 
 
 
 
|-
| colspan="8" bgcolor="#E9E9E9"|
|-

2002

 
 
 
 
 
 
|-
| colspan="8" bgcolor="#E9E9E9"|
|-

1997

 
 
 
 
 
 
|-
| colspan="8" bgcolor="#E9E9E9"|
|-

Sources
Official results of French elections from 2002: "Résultats électoraux officiels en France" (in French).

11